Monklands West was a constituency represented in the House of Commons of the Parliament of the United Kingdom from 1983 until 1997. It elected one Member of Parliament (MP), using the first-past-the-post voting system.

It was then replaced by the Coatbridge & Chryston constituency.

Boundaries
The Monklands District electoral divisions of Coatbridge North and Coatbridge South, and the Strathkelvin District electoral division of Chryston and Kelvin Valley.

Members of Parliament

Election results

Elections of the 1980s

Elections of the 1990s

References

Historic parliamentary constituencies in Scotland (Westminster)
Constituencies of the Parliament of the United Kingdom established in 1983
Constituencies of the Parliament of the United Kingdom disestablished in 1997
Politics of North Lanarkshire
Coatbridge